Joseph Jarman (September 14, 1937 – January 9, 2019) was an American jazz musician, composer, poet, and Shinshu Buddhist priest. He was one of the first members of the Association for the Advancement of Creative Musicians and a member of the Art Ensemble of Chicago.

Biography

Early life
He was born in Pine Bluff, Arkansas, United States. Jarman grew up in Chicago, Illinois. At DuSable High School, he studied drums with Walter Dyett, switching to saxophone and clarinet when he joined the United States Army after graduation. During his time there, he was part of the 11th Airborne Division Band for a year.

The AACM and his solo band
After he was discharged from the Army in 1958, Jarman attended Wilson Junior College, where he met bassist Malachi Favors Maghostut and saxophonists Roscoe Mitchell, Henry Threadgill, and Anthony Braxton. These men would often perform long jam sessions at the suggestion of their professor, Richard Wang (now with Illinois University). Mitchell introduced Jarman to pianist Muhal Richard Abrams, and Jarman, Mitchell, and Maghostut joined Abrams' Experimental Band, a private, non-performing ensemble, when that group was founded in 1961. The same group of musicians continued to play together in a variety of configurations, and went on to found the Association for the Advancement of Creative Musicians (AACM) in 1965, along with Fred Anderson and Phil Cohran.

Jarman's solo recording career began at this time, with two releases on the Delmark label which included material, such as spoken word and "little instruments", that would later characterize the sound of the Art Ensemble. The band he fronted and used during these recordings between 1966 and 1968, included Fred Anderson (tenor sax), Billy Brimfield (trumpet), Charles Clark (bass), Christopher Gaddy (piano) and Thurman Barker (drums). However, in 1969, Clark and Gaddy both died and Jarman disbanded his group.

The Art Ensemble of Chicago and Equal Interest
Shortly after his bandmates Clark and Gaddy died in 1969, Jarman joined Mitchell, Maghostut and Lester Bowie (trumpet) in the Roscoe Mitchell Art Ensemble in 1967; the group would be later rounded out with the addition of Don Moye on drums. This band eventually became known as the Art Ensemble of Chicago (AECO). The group was known for being costumed on stage for different reasons; Jarman wore facepaint and has mentioned that it "was sort of the shamanistic image coming from various cultures." The group moved to Paris in 1969, and lived there for many years in a commune that included Steve McCall, the drummer who went on the form the jazz trio Air, with Threadgill and bassist Fred Hopkins. Moving back to Chicago in the 1970s, Jarman lived in a musicians' building in Hyde Park, in Chicago, with Malachi Favors as his roommate. In 1983, he moved to Brooklyn, New York from Chicago and lived there until his death.

Jarman stayed with the Ensemble until 1993, when he left the group to focus on his spiritual practice, "a cleansing process" as he stated. The move was not announced at first, leading fans to speculate about Jarman's health when he did not appear on stage for an AECO Thanksgiving weekend show at the Knitting Factory in 1994. He did not have much to do with music until 1996 when, in January, he recorded two CDs, The Scott Fields Ensembles' 48 Motives and the concert, duo CD Connecting Spirits with Marilyn Crispell, which Fields produced. Later in the year, his friend and fellow AACM peer Leroy Jenkins asked him to join a trio with him and Myra Melford in Chicago, which would eventually be called Equal Interest. Looking back on those three years without music, Jarman commented that "I didn't realize it, but it actually depressed me in many ways." He was then commissioned to write a chamber orchestra piece, which led him to the realization of how to incorporate his Buddhist teachings into his music. Jarman returned to the AECO in January 2003.

Along with the saxophone and clarinet, Jarman also played (and recorded on) nearly every member of the woodwind family, as well as a wide variety of percussion instruments. Aside from his work with relatively traditional jazz line-ups, he also composed for larger orchestras and created multimedia pieces for musicians and dancers.

Spirituality
Jarman was most widely known for his musical accomplishments, but he was also involved in the practice of Zen Buddhism and aikido. He began his study of aikido in the early 1970s in the Hyde Park neighborhood of Chicago. He began studying Zen Buddhism in 1990 and visited various monasteries in Eastern Asia, including Higashi Honganji Honzon in Kyoto, Japan. A few years later, he opened his own aikido dojo/zendo, Jikishinkan ("direct mind training hall"), in Brooklyn, New York. He was latterly a Jodo Shinshu priest, and held a rank of godan (fifth degree black belt) in aikido.

Joseph Jarman died of respiratory failure at the Lillian Booth Actors Home in Englewood, New Jersey on January 9, 2019, as announced by the New York chapter of the AACM on their website. He was 81.

Discography

As leader/co-leader
 1966 – Song For (Delmark)
 1968 – As If It Were the Seasons (Delmark)
 1971 – Together Alone (Delmark) with Anthony Braxton
 1977 – Egwu-Anwu (Sun Song) (India Navigation) with Don Moye
 1979 – The Magic Triangle (Black Saint) with Don Pullen & Don Moye
 1979 – Black Paladins (Black Saint) with Don Moye & Johnny Dyani
 1981 – Earth Passage - Density (Black Saint) with Don Moye, Craig Harris & Rafael Garrett
 1983 – Inheritance (Four Star, 1991) with Geri Allen, Fred Hopkins and Don Moye
 1991 – Calypso's Smile (AECO) with Don Moye
 1996 – Connecting Spirits (Music & Arts) with Marilyn Crispell
 1996 – Pachinko Dream Track 10 (Music & Arts)
 1997 – Out of the Mist (Ocean) with Leroy Jenkins
 1997 – Return of the Lost Tribe (Delmark) as Bright Moments: with Kalaparusha Maurice McIntyre, Kahil El'Zabar, Malachi Favors and Steve Colson
 1997 – Equal Interest (OmniTone) as Equal Interest: with Leroy Jenkins and Myra Melford
 2002 – Lifetime Vision Orchestra: Vision Festival 2002 (Jyuku Sound)

With the Art Ensemble of Chicago

As sideman
With Anthony Braxton
For Trio (Arista, 1978)

With Jerome Cooper
Outer and Interactions (About Time, 1988)

With Alan Silva
Seasons (BYG, 1971)

References

External links

Audio Recordings of WCUW Jazz Festivals – Jazz History Database
Aikido teacher profile
Art Ensemble of Chicago web site
Solo concert on SASSAS sound. concert archive
Official home page
insideoutintheopen.net/  Documentary film

1937 births
2019 deaths
Avant-garde jazz musicians
American jazz clarinetists
American jazz saxophonists
American male saxophonists
American jazz composers
American male jazz composers
Art Ensemble of Chicago members
Jazz musicians from Illinois
Musicians from Chicago
People from Pine Bluff, Arkansas
Military personnel from Illinois
American aikidoka
American Zen Buddhists
Converts to Buddhism
21st-century American saxophonists
Jazz musicians from Arkansas
21st-century American male musicians
20th-century American saxophonists